The Seine is a  river in northern France. Its drainage basin is in the Paris Basin (a geological relative lowland) covering most of northern France. It is navigable by ocean-going vessels as far as Rouen,  from the sea. Over 60 percent of its length, as far as Burgundy, is negotiable by large barges and most tour boats, and nearly its whole length is available for recreational boating; excursion boats offer sightseeing tours of the river banks in the capital city, Paris.

There are 37 bridges in Paris across the Seine (the most famous of which are the Pont Alexandre III and the Pont Neuf) and dozens more outside the city. A notable bridge, which is also the last along the course of the river, is the Pont de Normandie, the ninth longest cable-stayed bridge in the world, which links Le Havre and Honfleur.

Sources 

The source has been owned by the city of Paris since 1864. A number of closely associated small ditches or depressions provide the source waters, with an artificial grotto laid out to highlight and contain a deemed main source.  The grotto includes a statue of a nymph, a dog, and a dragon. On the same site are the buried remains of a Gallo-Roman temple. Small statues of the dea Sequana "Seine goddess" and other ex-votos found at the same place are now exhibited in the Dijon archaeological museum.

Course 
The Seine can artificially be divided into five parts:
 the Petite Seine, "Small Seine" from the sources to Montereau-Fault-Yonne
 the Haute Seine, "Upper Seine" from Montereau-Fault-Yonne to Paris
 the Traversée de Paris, "the Paris waterway"
 the Basse Seine, "Lower Seine" from Paris to Rouen
 the Seine maritime, "Maritime Seine" from Rouen to the English channel.

Below Rouen, the river passes through the Parc Naturel Régional des Boucles de la Seine Normande, a French regional nature park.

Navigation
The Seine is dredged and ocean-going vessels can dock at Rouen,  from the sea. Commercial craft (barges and push-tows) can use the river beginning at Marcilly-sur-Seine,  to its mouth.

At Paris, there are 37 bridges.

The Seine Maritime,  from the English Channel at Le Havre to Rouen, is the only portion of the Seine used by ocean-going craft. The tidal section of the Seine Maritime is followed by a canalized section (Basse Seine) with four large multiple locks until the mouth of the Oise at Conflans-Sainte-Honorine. Smaller locks at Bougival and at Suresnes lift the vessels to the level of the river in Paris, where the junction with the Canal Saint-Martin is located.

At Charenton-le-Pont is the mouth of the Marne. Upstream from Paris seven locks ensure navigation to Saint Mammès, where the Loing mouth is situated. Through an eighth lock the river Yonne is reached at Montereau-Fault-Yonne. From the mouth of the Yonne, larger ships can continue upstream to Nogent-sur-Seine (7 locks). From there on, the river is navigable only by small craft to Marcilly-sur-Seine (4 locks). At Marcilly-sur-Seine the 19th century Canal de la Haute-Seine used to allow vessels to continue all the way to Troyes. This canal has been abandoned since 1957.

Until locks were installed to raise the level in the 1800s, the river was much shallower within the city, and consisted of a small channel of continuous flow bordered by sandy banks (depicted in many illustrations of the period). Today the depth is tightly controlled and the entire width of the river between the built-up banks on either side is normally filled with water. The average flow of the river is very low, only a few cubic metres per second, but much higher flows are possible during periods of heavy runoff.

Dams and flood control
Four large storage reservoirs have been built since 1950 on the Seine as well as its tributaries Yonne, Marne, and Aube. These help in maintaining a constant level for the river through the city, but cannot prevent significant increases in river level during periods of extreme runoff. The dams are Lac d’Orient, Lac des Settons, Lake Der-Chantecoq, and Auzon-Temple and Amance, respectively.

Flooding

A very severe period of high water in January 1910 resulted in extensive flooding throughout the city. The Seine again rose to threatening levels in 1924, 1955, 1982, 1999–2000, June 2016, and January 2018. After a first-level flood alert in 2003, about 100,000 works of art were moved out of Paris, the largest relocation of art since World War II. Much of the art in Paris is kept in underground storage rooms that would have been flooded. A 2002 report by the French government stated the worst-case Seine flood scenario would cost 10 billion euros and cut telephone service for a million Parisians, leaving 200,000 without electricity and 100,000 without gas.

2018 Paris flood
An official warning was issued on 24 January that heavy rainfall was likely to cause the river to flood. By 27 January, the river was rising. The Deputy Mayor of Paris, Colombe Brossel, warned that the heavy rain was caused by climate change, and that "We have to understand that climatic change is not a word, it's a reality."

Watershed
In addition to Paris, three other cities with a population over 100,000 are in the Seine watershed: Le Havre at the estuary, Rouen in the Seine valley and Reims at the northern limit—with an annual urban growth rate of 0.2 percent. The population density is 201 per square kilometer.

Tributaries
Tributaries of the Seine are, from source to mouth:

Ource (right)
Barse (right)
Aube (right)
Yonne (left)
Loing (left)
Almont (right)
Essonne (left)
Orge (left)
Yerres (right)
Marne (right)
Bièvre (left)
Oise (right)
Aubette de Meulan (right)
Mauldre (left)
Vaucouleurs (left)
Epte (right)
Andelle (right)
Eure (left)
Oison (left)
Aubette (right)
Cailly (right)
Austreberthe (right)
Commerce (right)
Risle (left)
Lézarde (right)

Water quality
Periodically the sewage systems of Paris experience a failure known as sanitary sewer overflow, often in periods of high rainfall. Under these conditions untreated sewage is discharged into the Seine. The resulting oxygen deficit is principally caused by allochthonous bacteria larger than one micrometre in size. The specific activity of these sewage bacteria is typically three to four times greater than that of the autochthonous (background) bacterial population. Heavy metal concentrations in the Seine are relatively high. The pH level of the Seine at Pont Neuf has been measured to be 8.46. Despite this, the water quality has improved significantly over what several historians at various times in the past called an "open sewer".

In 2009, it was announced that Atlantic salmon had returned to the Seine.

History

Name
The name  comes from Gaullish , from the Celtic Gallo-Roman goddess of the river, as offerings for her were found at the source. Sometimes it is associated with Latin; the Latin word seems to derive from the same root as Latin sequor (I follow) and English sequence, namely Proto-Indo-European *seikw-, signifying 'to flow' or 'to pour forth'.

Events

On 28 or 29 March 845, an army of Vikings led by a chieftain named Reginherus, which is possibly another name for Ragnar Lothbrok, sailed up the River Seine with siege towers and sacked Paris.

On 25 November 885, another Viking expedition led by Rollo was sent up the River Seine to attack Paris again.

In March, 1314, King Philip IV of France had Jacques de Molay, last Grand Master of the Knights Templar, burned on a scaffold on an island in the River Seine in front of Notre Dame de Paris.

After the burning at the stake of Joan of Arc in 1431, her ashes were thrown into the Seine from the medieval stone Mathilde Bridge at Rouen, though unserious counter-claims persist.

On August 9, 1803 Robert Fulton, American painter and marine engineer, made his first successful test of his steamboat in the Seine beside the Tuileries Garden. Having a length of sixty-six feet and an eight-foot beam Fulton’s steamboat attained speeds of three to four miles per hour against the Seine’s current.

According to his will, Napoleon, who died in 1821, wished to be buried on the banks of the Seine. His request was not granted.

At the 1900 Summer Olympics, the river hosted the rowing, swimming, and water polo events. Twenty-four years later, it hosted the rowing events again at Bassin d'Argenteuil, along the Seine north of Paris.

Until the 1930s, a towing system using a chain on the bed of the river existed to facilitate movement of barges upriver. Listed in World Canals by  Charles Hadfield, David & Charles 1986.

The Seine was one of the original objectives of Operation Overlord in 1944. The Allies' intention was to reach the Seine by 90 days after D-Day. That objective was met. An anticipated assault crossing of the river never materialized as German resistance in France crumbled by early September 1944. However, the First Canadian Army did encounter resistance immediately west of the Seine and fighting occurred in the Forêt de la Londe as Allied troops attempted to cut off the escape across the river of parts of the German 7th Army in the closing phases of the Battle of Normandy.

Some of the Algerian victims of the Paris massacre of 1961 drowned in the Seine after being thrown by French policemen from the Pont Saint-Michel and other locations in Paris.

Dredging in the 1960s mostly eliminated tidal bores on the lower river, known in French as "le mascaret."

In 1991 UNESCO added the banks of the Seine in Paris—the Rive Gauche and Rive Droite—to its list of World Heritage Sites in Europe.

Since 2002 Paris-Plages has been held every summer on the Paris banks of the Seine: a transformation of the paved banks into a beach with sand and facilities for sunbathing and entertainment.

In 2007, 55 bodies were retrieved from its waters; in February 2008, the body of supermodel-turned-activist Katoucha Niane was found there.

In 2024, the River is set to be host to a boat parade with boats for each national delegation during the opening ceremony of the 2024 Summer Olympics.

In fiction 
The Seine was the river that Javert, the primary antagonist of Victor Hugo's 1862 novel Les Misérables, drowned himself in. This scene is also featured in the eponymous musical. It was also the river that an angry mob pushed Erik, the Phantom, main antagonist of Gaston Leroux’s The Phantom of the Opera (1910) into, and he, too, drowns. 

In Ludwig Bemelmans' 1953 children's book Madeline's Rescue and the 1998 live-action adaptation of Madeline, Madeline accidentally falls into the Seine after standing on the ledge of a bridge. The notable difference between the two is that in the book, Madeline fell over after playing on the ledge, whereas in the film, she fell over trying to justify her actions towards Pepito that got all the girls in trouble.

In the 2016 film La La Land, Mia, the female protagonist, sang about her aunt who jumped into the Seine without looking and how it is similar to all the dreamers in the world who keep on dreaming, in her final audition "Audition (The Fools Who Dream)”. The song was nominated for Best Original Song in the 89th Academy Awards.

In art 
During the 19th and the 20th centuries in particular the Seine inspired many artists, including:

 Frédéric Bazille 
 Maurice Boitel 
 Richard Parkes Bonington 
 Eugène Boudin 
 Camille Corot 
 Charles-François Daubigny 
 Guy Debord
 Raoul Dufy 
 Othon Friesz 
 Carl Fredrik Hill
 Eugène Isabey 
 Johan Barthold Jongkind 
 Raimond Lecourt 
 Albert Marquet 
 Henri Matisse
 Claude Monet 
 Luis F. Pinzón 
 Camille Pissarro 
 Emilio Grau Sala 
 Gaston Sébire 
 Georges Seurat
 Alfred Sisley
 Constant Troyon 
 J. M. W. Turner
 Félix Vallotton 
 Édouard Vuillard 

 Pierre Auguste Renoir

A song 'La Seine' by Flavien Monod and Guy Lafarge was written in 1948.

Josephine Baker recorded a song 'La Seine'

A song 'La seine' by Vanessa Paradis feat. Matthieu Chedid was originally written as a soundtrack for the movie 'A Monster in Paris'

See also
 The department of Seine, abolished in 1968
 Seine River Steamers
 List of crossings of the Seine

References

External links
 Website on the Great Flood of 1910 
 Lower Seine (Seine aval) with maps and information on places, ports and moorings on the river from Honfleur to Paris, by the author of Inland Waterways of France, Imray
 Upper Seine (Haute Seine and Petite Seine) with maps and information on places, ports and moorings on the river from Paris to Marcilly-sur-Seine, by the author of Inland Waterways of France, Imray
 Navigation details for 80 French rivers and canals (French waterways website section)

Venues of the 1900 Summer Olympics
Venues of the 1924 Summer Olympics
Venues of the 2024 Summer Olympics
Olympic rowing venues
Olympic swimming venues
Olympic water polo venues
Olympic triathlon venues
 
Rivers of France
 
Rivers of Aube
Rivers of Côte-d'Or
Rivers of Eure
Rivers of Hauts-de-Seine
Rivers of Paris
Water transport in France
Rivers of Seine-et-Marne
Rivers of Seine-Maritime
Rivers of Val-de-Marne
Rivers of Yvelines
World Heritage Sites in France
Rivers of Île-de-France
Rivers of Normandy